José María Vargas Ponce (10 March 1786, in La Guaira – 13 April 1854, in New York City) was the president of Venezuela from 1835 to 1836. Vargas was Venezuela's first civilian president.

He graduated with a degree in philosophy from the Seminario Tridentino, and obtained in 1809 his medical degree from the Real y Pontificia Universidad de Caracas.  Vargas was imprisoned in 1813 for revolutionary activities.  Upon his release in 1813, he travelled to Europe for medical training. Vargas performed cataract surgery. He was one of the earliest oculists (eye surgeons) in Puerto Rico after his arrival there in 1817. He returned to Venezuela to practice medicine and surgery in 1825. He resigned from his presidency in 1836.

Personal life
José María Vargas was married to Encarnación Maitín, who served as First Lady of Venezuela from 1835 to 1836. 
In 1877, his ashes were brought to Caracas and buried in the National Pantheon on 27 April of that same year.

Honors
The Venezuelan state of Vargas is named after him.

References

External links

  Doctor José María Vargas – Official biography.
  José María Vargas
 

Presidents of Venezuela
Venezuelan ophthalmologists
Central University of Venezuela alumni
Academic staff of the Central University of Venezuela
People from La Guaira
1786 births
1854 deaths
Conservative Party (Venezuela) politicians
Venezuelan people of Canarian descent
Venezuelan people of Spanish descent
Burials at the National Pantheon of Venezuela